Piggy Tales is a Finnish computer-animated television series based on Bad Piggies, a spin-off of Angry Birds. Animated in a style resembling clay animation before transitioning into computer-generated imagery after the release of The Angry Birds Movie, the series focuses on the life of the minion pigs, and it has no dialogue. It was produced by Rovio Entertainment, with the French studio Cube Creative providing some of the animation.

Piggy Tales premiered in 2014 on the Toons.TV channel through the Angry Birds applications and on the Toons.TV website. The series continued by the second season, subtitled Pigs at Work in 2015; the third season, subtitled Third Act in 2016; and the fourth and final season, subtitled 4th Street in 2018.

Episodes

Series overview

Season 1 (2014–2015)

Season 2: Piggy Tales: Pigs at Work (2015-2017)
The second season focuses on pigs as they do "pigstruction" work.
A special episode based on the Goosebumps film was released after the series' end on 10 February 2016 in the Angry Birds' official YouTube channel.

Season 3: Piggy Tales: Third Act (2016–17)
The third season of Piggy Tales is subtitled "Third Act". Consisting of a total of 35 1-minute episodes, the season's main themes are: "Summer Sports", "Back to School", "Halloween", and "Happy Holidays". All episodes are set in a theatre in downtown Pig City (as seen in The Angry Birds Movie), showing pigs as they "rehearse and horse around on-stage." The first episode premiered on 3 June 2016 on the iOS and Android app of Toons.TV, followed by the release on the Toons.TV YouTube channel on 5 June 2016. The last episode was released on 5 February 2017. The pigs' design is based on that of their design in The Angry Birds Movie. With the introduction of this new season came a shift in the art style from claymation to computer-generated imagery.

: Piggy Tales: 4th Street (2018–2019; 2017 for the season's DVD & iTunes early releases)
A fourth and final season, titled 4th Street, and consisting of 30 episodes, will take place "on a street corner in Pig City where the loveable pigs put a comical spin on everyday situations."  Despite plans to release it sometime in 2017, this season was delayed to 2018.

Despite this delay, Rovio later released a special Halloween-themed sneak-peek episode of the season, titled "Scary Fog", on 21 October 2017, as part of the Angry Birds' 2017 Halloween celebration, on the Angry Birds YouTube channel. A later one, called Holiday Heist, was released on 16 December 2017, as the franchise celebrated Christmas. Around that time, however, the complete season of Piggy Tales: 4th Street and all of its episodes were released early during December 2017 on iTunes in Piggy Tales Vol. 7 & Piggy Tales Vol. 8 and on DVD in Piggy Tales: The Complete 4th Season. These early releases on DVD & iTunes happened even before the beginning of 2018, as well as the planned schedule for all of the series' episodes to be uploaded in the Angry Birds YouTube channel in 2018. The official release for the series was 10 February 2018, starting with Pig City Valentine.

Home media
Sony Pictures Home Entertainment is the DVD distributor for the series.
 Piggy Tales: The Complete 1st Season (1 December 2015)
 Piggy Tales: Pigs at Work: The Complete 2nd Season (1 March 2016)
 Piggy Tales: Third Act: The Complete 3rd Season (11 April 2017)
 Piggy Tales: The Complete 4th Season (22 December 2017)

References

External links
  at ToonsTV
  at ToonsTV
  at ToonsTV
 

2014 Finnish television series debuts
2019 Finnish television series endings
Angry Birds television series
2010s Finnish television series
Computer-animated television series
Finnish animated television series
Television series by Rovio Entertainment
Animated television series about pigs
Animated television series spinoffs
KidsClick
Animated television series without speech